The Ford Think City (stylized as the TH!NK City) was a compact electric hatchback produced by the Ford Motor Company's Norwegian subsidiary TH!NK from 2000 until 2002. It was leased in limited numbers in Europe and the United States.

The vehicle was known as the Pivco PIV4 in its prototype phase. Ford bought the Norwegian company in 1999 in anticipation of the incoming California Air Resources Board zero emissions vehicle mandate. After the laws partially wound back and made less stringent, Ford ceased production of the vehicle in 2002 with 1,005 units produced. Ford sold the Norwegian electric car company the following year.

More than 370 vehicles were delivered to customers in North America. They were largely leased to individuals and companies as part of station car trials in California and New York. NHTSA regulations stipulated that these vehicles could not legally remain in the United States beyond the three-year time frame for these trials. Around half of the North American units were scrapped while the other half were exported back to Norway as used cars.

The next generation Think City would go on to be released in 2008 by an independent company.

References

See also
Think City
Think Global
General Motors EV1

Think City
Production electric cars
Electric city cars
2000s cars
Automotive industry in Norway